Honda CB Trigger or CB150 is a 150 cc single cylinder four-stroke engine motorcycle developed by Honda Motorcycle & Scooter India (HMSI) and introduced in 2013. The motorcycle is known as Trigger in the Indian, Sri Lankan and Bangladeshi markets. The bike is featured with advanced Combined braking system (CBS), digital instrumental panel and viscous air filter, LED tail lamps and alloy-wheels. It replaced the Unicorn Dazzler. Trigger is available in black, meteor green metallic, pearl siena red and pearl sunbeam white colors.

In 2015, the bike was replaced by the 160 cc CB Hornet 160R.

References

Unicorn
Standard motorcycles
Motorcycles introduced in 2013